The Kuppam River is a river mainly within the Kannur district of the Indian state of Kerala, although a smaller section of the river is in Karnataka.

Course
The Kuppam River originates in the Brahmagiri Wildlife Sanctuary of Kodagu district, near the Kerala-Karnataka border. From its source it flows west through Taliparamba and Kannur taluks, passing Therandy, Cheriyoor, Pachheni, Iringal, Kuppam, Pattuvam, Payangadi, and Matool. It flows into the Lakshadweep Sea just north of Azhikkal, after meeting the Valapattanam River. Other tributaries include the Chiriyathodu, Mukuttathodu, Alakuttathodu, and Pakkattupoya rivers.

Basin

Temples on Kuppam River

Religious sites on the Kuppam river include Patavil Shree Muthappan Madapura and two Jumamasjids on either side of the river near the Kuppam Bridge.

Bridges on Kuppam River
Bridges that cross the Kuppam include one which is used by National Highway 66, and one at Payangudi which is used by a state highway.

See also
 Kuppam
 Taliparamba
 Narikkod
 Iringal
 Vellavu
 Vavad
 Thiruvettoor
 Chapparapadavu

References

Rivers of Kannur district